Full results of the 2009 Indian general election by party.

See also
 Results of the 2009 Indian general election by state
 Results of the 2009 Indian general election by parliamentary constituency

References
  
 

2009 Indian general election
Election results by party
Results of general elections in India